"Fresh Strawberries" is a song by Scottish indie rock band Franz Ferdinand. On 4 April 2014, it was released digitally as the fifth single from the band's fourth studio album Right Thoughts, Right Words, Right Action. A song titled "Erdbeer Mund" ("Strawberry Mouth" in English), sung in German by Nick McCarthy, was chosen as the single's B-side.

Music videos
A music video for "Fresh Strawberries" was released onto YouTube on 12 March 2014. The black-and-white video was directed by Margarita Louca.

On 4 March 2014, a music video for the B-side "Erdbeer Mund", shot in Bavaria and directed by Nick McCarthy's sister Anna McCarthy, was also released.

Track listing

Personnel
Personnel adapted from the album's liner notes

Franz Ferdinand
Alex Kapranos – lead vocals ("Fresh Strawberries"), guitar, composing, mixing, pre-production, and production
Nick McCarthy – lead vocals ("Erdbeer Mund"), rhythm guitar, and keyboards
Bob Hardy – bass guitar
Paul Thomson – drums

Additional musicians
Roxanne Clifford – backing vocals
Manuel Gernedel - backing vocals
Miriam Newman - backing vocals

Production personnel
Ch4in$ - pre-production
Eskimo Peach - additional engineering
Mark Ralph - engineering and mixing

Charts

Release history

References

2013 songs
2014 singles
Franz Ferdinand (band) songs
Songs written by Alex Kapranos
Songs written by Nick McCarthy
Domino Recording Company singles
Black-and-white music videos